NSITE High School (formerly Business Careers High School)  is a business and technology magnet high school part of the Northside Independent School District in San Antonio, Texas.  It is a "school within a school" located on the campus of Oliver Wendell Holmes High School.  The school attracts students who want to study business and other related fields. The school allows the students to grasp the concepts of the business world easier by offering laptops to each student to use for a school purposes.

History 

Northside Independent School District and the business community combined their resources in 1991 to create Business Careers High School.

Curriculum 
Business Careers High School is a magnet school that focuses on business aspects.  The curriculum at BCHS is intended to expose students to business professions, with classes including business etiquette, finance, and technology.  Such components also include proper business attire and etiquette.  The curriculum gives students a plan for college.  Students may choose to follow their interests while choosing classes specific to their needs or participate in one of the academy curricula offered at Business Careers.  Additionally, BC students make frequent field trips to local businesses and workplaces.

Campus life 
Business Careers High School has the same location as Oliver Wendell Holmes High School.  As such, the school mascot and many activities will be under Holmes High School.  The mascot of the school is the Siberian Husky and the school colors are green and gold.  Students attending BCHS may participate in organizations and clubs in the same manner as Holmes students do.  Students are also mixed in with Holmes students in their classes and only differentiate when taking strictly BC courses such as Financial Planning.  Class sizes are rather small and are more one-to-one focused, especially in the business courses and the honors program.  Student's also participate in the same UIL (University Interscholastic League) events such as the fine arts program (band, choir, art, orchestra, theatre, etc.) and sports activities. Students are also allowed to participate in many clubs and organizations such as the Young Women's Organization (YWO) and Young Men's Organization (YMO) as well as the Goldenbelles and Silverbelles (Pep Squad, Dance Team, and Cheerleaders), the AFJROTC, Academic Decathlon team and its UIL event teams.

Community 
Business Careers High School serves students from across San Antonio.  Students residing in nearby districts, such as Edgewood and San Antonio ISD may attend Business Careers with the approval of the administration.  The traditional high school, Holmes, serves around 1500 students from grades 9–12.

Accreditation 
Business Careers High School, along with its parent school Holmes High School, is accredited by the Texas Education Agency (TEA).

TEA rating 
Business Careers High School shares its rating with Holmes.  Holmes is currently rated by the Texas Education Agency as "Academically Acceptable". The TEA is the agency who rates schools based on the performance of the school on tests such as the Texas Assessment of Knowledge and Skills.

Population 
As a magnet school, the population is significantly lower than a traditional high school.  The population of Business Careers for the 2006–07 year was 573.  The mother school, Holmes, includes Business Careers as part of its total population, therefore the total population of Holmes is around 2100 students having around 1500 students of its own.

Application process 
The application process for Business Careers is much like the other magnet schools in NISD.  A student planning to attend BCHS must fill out an application form.  The typical form includes a section to sign residential information and a section where the student must briefly explain why they want to attend Business Careers.  Middle school 8th grade students are the target of the BCHS recruiters since it will be their first year in high school and it is easier for them to take full advantage of the programs offered at BCHS, but occasionally students already in high school may be eligible to apply provided that they meet the requirements to attend.  For 8th graders to attend the following year, they must have at least a "C" average and have a good attendance record with few disciplinary problems.  Those already in high school may apply provided that they meet the previously stated requirements and apply by the end of the 9th-grade year.  For 10th graders to be considered for acceptance they must already be taking business-related courses in their current high school.  No 11th graders may apply for acceptance the following year.  Should the applicant meet the requirements he/she will receive a notice of acceptance.  As with all magnet schools in NISD, the school cannot accept everyone.  Cap limits were initially stated at 170 students each year, but recently it has increased its quota.

Current schedule 
Business Careers High School is currently on a traditional high school schedule.  It operates on an 8-period day schedule, divided into two semesters.  Classes meet for 45 minutes a day with one lunch period so students can earn up to seven Texas HS credits a year.  Recently though, a new program being offered at Holmes High School which is open to students at BCHS is the Zero/9 period schedule.  This schedule, which started in the 2006–07 year, includes an additional 50-minute period class before or after school which gives students a chance to get ahead or catch up on their traditional Texas credit requirements.

Higher education ties 
Business Careers High School has ties with several colleges and universities.  Because of this, students at BCHS are allowed field trips to experience first-hand views on certain institutions for higher education.  Several of these include The University of Texas at San Antonio, Texas State University, UT Austin, and campuses in the Alamo Community College District.  This also allows students at BCHS to take "Dual Credit" courses and receive college credit hours per course at San Antonio College and Northwest Vista College.  Some of these include Principles of Real Estate, Calculus AP, and English 4 Honors.

Local corporate partnerships 
BCHS has partnerships with various companies in and around San Antonio.  Originally the curriculum was created by leaders within these corporations.  Some of the partnerships include: Wells Fargo, Security Service Federal Credit Union, American Funds, and Washington Mutual.  With the help of these companies' contributions organizations such as the Academy of Finance, and BPA are available to the students.  Even some classes offered wouldn't be available without the help of funds generated from these corporations.  An example would be the Banking and Financial Systems junior course needed for AOF.

Academies 

BCHS has two academies that only Business Careers students may take part in, but are not required to graduate.  They include the Academy of Finance and the Academy of Travel and Tourism; both academies are sponsored by the National Academy Foundation (NAF).  These academies give students a more focused view on the field of study they may pursue and as such, have their own unique set of career and technology courses that go along with it to successfully complete the program.

Academy of Finance 

The Academy of Finance provides students with the knowledge and skills to prepare them for the work of an accountant or other financial professions. Usually, AOF students are required to take specific courses and participate in a summer internship the summer before their senior year.  Classes taken to enhance financial knowledge include, but are not limited to:  Introduction to Business, BCIS 1, Business Communication, Accounting 1 and 2, Banking and Finance, International Business, Securities and Insurance, Financial Planning, E-Commerce, and the dual credit course with San Antonio College, Principles of Real Estate.  The academy has many benefits, including a senior trip to New York City, the certificate of financial studies, and being recognized at graduation with honor cords.

Cyber Academy 
This third academy began as a pilot class in the 2006–07 school year with the inclusion of an Oracle programming class. Successful completion of the course may certify students in the field of structured query language (SQL) programming.

Mentorship Program 
In Business Careers' mentor program, students are paired up with individuals in the workforce (notable business and finance) that can relate personality-wise and by life goals.  Student's can learn from members of society about real-world experiences and outside issues.  The mentor program takes place at least once a month during lunchtime where the student's meet with their mentor to discuss experiences.  For the year, the mentor usually brings lunch for the mentee.  The program ends each year with a banquet to thank the mentors for their time.  This event takes place in May, usually at Oak Hills Country Club, where the student offers to pay for the mentor's meal in honor of their experiences.  The mentor program aims to provide opportunities for students to gain exposure to new jobs and careers.

Annual job fair 
BCHS hosts an annual job fair every year for students who have attained at least a junior status in high school.  Usually, students in the Academy of Finance are required to participate.  The job fair's main purpose is to find candidates for summer internships and possible co-op studies.  Just like traditional job fairs, the BCHS job fair requires students to dress professionally, come prepared with resumes and ready for interviews.  Usually companies such as KSAT 12, NISD, Washington Mutual, Security Service Federal Credit Union, Wells Fargo, HEB, and SeaWorld San Antonio participate in the job fair searching for possible interns.

Co-op classes 
The co-op program allows students to go to school half-a-day and then work the other half while still gaining high school credits.  Usually, to be accepted into the program students need to have already been hired at a job.  Credits for the actual course are considered business credits.

UTSA Leadership Challenge 
BCHS has many ties with the local universities in Texas and one of them is with UTSA.  The program began at UTSA in 1992 which later teamed up with Business Careers, creating a program for the high school seniors and college students in business, known as the "Leadership Challenge."  The program selects 16 students from Business Careers who have outstanding leadership potential and 16 students from UTSA that meet the requirements set forth by UTSA's standards.  The program is meant to teach these individuals the meaning of having a wider perspective of the future of "leaders" by exposing these individuals to various places around San Antonio that are worth exploring.  Field trips to places such as United Way, the Jewish Community Center, and the wilderness are crucial to the program.  Other times "speaker luncheons" are necessary when local business leaders come and talk about their experiences.  The program usually takes the entire school year.

Security Service Mobile Unit 
Unique to only two Northside schools, the other being Clark HS, at the time is the presence of the Security Service Mobile Unit.  Typically this "mobile bank" is available on Mondays and Wednesdays during lunch periods for transactions to the students and teachers.  Students may set up accounts and make transactions as if they were actually at a bank.  Also unique is the appearance of volunteer students.  Each year Business Careers students are asked to volunteer to help run the mobile unit at school.  Students may apply to volunteer there at the beginning of each consecutive school year.

Dress Code / "Dress for Success" Days 
"Dress for Success" days are a long-time tradition started in business high schools all across the country. This provides the opportunity for students to dress in business attire, i.e. long-sleeve button-up shirt with tie and slacks for males and various business dress for females. This new change in dress and grooming began with an idea that principal, Geri Berger suggested during the 2005–06 school year.  The original intent was to have students dress appropriately for school so it was created to prepare students for the demands of the workforce, and in turn, students are approached and offered internships with business collaboratives or with alumni who run their own businesses.  "Dress for Success" days are usually scheduled every other Tuesday in opposition to the Academy of Finance shirt day on alternating weeks. The "Dress for Success" is not required, they are not for a grade. It is the student's choice to take part in the tradition, unless going on a field trip; then the student is required to "dress for success".  It allows you to wear anything you desire.

Grades and class rankings 

Business Careers High School has been known for exemplary students.  Grades at this magnet school are typically higher than traditional high schools and as such, is said to be competitive.  To remain at BC, students are expected to maintain a "C" average or higher.  Holmes and Business Careers keep their graduating class sizes separate from each other to recognize each school's individual potentials, i.e. recognizing officially separate Valedictorians and Salutatorians.  Recognizing a Valedictorian/Salutatorian from each school helps to distinguish between those that work hard at BC and those at Holmes.  Holmes senior class sizes tend to vary between 240 students to as many as 600 depending on the year of enrollment, while Business Careers senior class sizes tend to vary with as many as over 200 to as low as 70.  The lower the class size, the more competitive the atmosphere tends to be since a class of 70 would make quartiles shorter and top ten percent 7 students.  Still, the school recognizes top ten students at graduation with just as much emphasis as a traditional high school.  A separate "combined" ranking is given to students at Business Careers their senior year to recognize higher potential students since low-class sizes can make some students look worse than others even though this is not an official class rank, it is just used for informational purposes only.  What makes the school competitive is its honors program which it shares with Holmes High School.  Advanced Placement (AP) subjects offered include Mathematics, English, Social studies, Science, Fine arts, International Language, and Computer Sciences.  Honors classes include the same.  Such courses give weighted points as deemed necessary for students' GPA (grade point average).  Honors courses are denoted 5 extra points and AP courses are denoted 8 extra points though these grades are not shown on a student's transcript, but are only reflected on a student's GPA.

Graduation requirements 
Graduation requirements at Business Careers High School are no different than any other high school in the state of Texas, but it includes an additional course of study in the business section.  A BCHS student's schedule emphasizes math, computer sciences, and business courses.  Additionally, the student's learn from business professionals through consistent field trips in actual business settings.  To earn a Business Careers High School diploma students must meet the requirements set forth by the Texas Education Agency and earn eight additional business credits (2 per grade level) and pass the TAKS (Texas Assessment of Knowledge and Skills).

Graduation 
Upon graduation, students receive their high school diploma.  Students graduating BC will usually wear gold caps, and gowns as opposed to the traditional green for Holmes graduates.  BC students may get recognized for one or more of the following:

Honor students 
Business Careers High School, like most high schools in Texas, is known for its Latin honors system for graduates.  At graduation at Business Careers, students are given honors based on their final cumulative grade point average.  GPA is not rounded to the nearest whole number, so thus students are forced to try harder to achieve the desired results.  The awards are as follows:

National Honor Society 
As with most schools in the country, Business Careers (Holmes) has its own chapter in the National Honor Society.  Membership is based on scholarship, character, leadership, and service.  Currently, the minimum GPA to join the NHS is an 89.0000.  At any time should a member's GPA drop to an 88.9999 or below he/she will be placed on probation to bring it up otherwise that student will be dropped from the program.  Those inducted who successfully complete the program's requirements (community service hours, aid in the fundraisers, etc.) will receive recognition in the graduation program along with the honor of wearing the NHS collar.

Academy of Finance 
Those students who are members of the AOF will receive special recognition in the graduation program along with the ability to wear the honor cords which may be a different shade of green (usually light green).

Top ten students 
Those students who rank in the top ten of their class will receive special recognition at the graduation ceremony.  Top ten students are usually given dark green honor cords to display and will usually sit in the front row at graduation while everyone else typically sits in alphabetical order regardless of class rank or any other merit.  Those graduating Valedictorian and Salutatorian will sit on stage alongside the senior Class president and Student Council President, as well as the principals and, will receive the NISD medallion for the honor at graduation.

Valedictorians and Salutatorians 
The title of Valedictorian is given to the individual who has a numerical class rank of 1 and the title of Salutatorian is given to the individual who has a numerical class rank of 2.  These two individuals will sit on stage at graduation, receive the NISD medallion recognizing them as Northside Independent School District scholars, and receive a plaque/framed-award as proof of the honor.  To be considered for these top two positions, the individuals must not only have the official numeric rank, but must also maintain high standards of scholarship, leadership, attendance, and responsibility.  An individual may be disqualified or removed from either position by failure to meet these standards.  Though official ranks are given at the end of the sixth semester, the official Valedictorian and Salutatorian will not be announced until after the seventh semester.  Once announced, these individuals will soon receive a notice for photos to be displayed on the NISD website in late May briefly telling about them and their future plans.  To this date, no ties for these positions have ever occurred, but should a case arise in the future the administration will deal with it accordingly.  Though, the odds of individuals receiving exactly the same GPA down to the fourth decimal are very slim.

Wireless laptop initiative 
In the 2006–07 school year, BCHS, to further educate the students of its school, began a new initiative in issuing laptops to each student attending the school.  BCHS was the first high school in the greater San Antonio area that had wireless communication. The one-to-one laptop initiative offers all students and teachers at BCHS continuous access to a wide range of software, electronic documents, the Internet, and other digital resources for teaching and learning.  Every student was issued a Gateway laptop to carry as his/her own for the school year which would be implemented into the curriculum at BCHS.  Each student was required to carry the laptop to and from class every day to complete daily assignments.  Also new was the creation of what was known as "Net storage" which was an internet database in which students could communicate assignments with teachers and vice versa. Netstorage is accessible from any computer as long as the student has there password and username. Each consecutive year new courses at BCHS will be created and the curriculum will become more and more dependent on the laptops to achieve success and ultimately greater knowledge of technology.  The slogan for the school with its new initiative is "Taking the lead with laptops."

In the recent school year (2007–2008) Net storage was replaced with s-files. Sfiles serves the same purpose of 'net storage', it is just easier for the students to learn and use.

Programs (including those with Holmes) 

Business Careers offers numerous programs including Business Professionals of America (BPA) and NAWBO (National Association of Women Business Owners).

Business Careers High School, since it is connected to Oliver Wendell Holmes High School, has a widely known Academic Decathlon team.  The team's efforts have managed to pull off some great results in the past few years.  At the state competition, the team has managed to come in 3rd ('04/'05), 2nd ('05/'06) and 5th ('06/'07).

Another successful program is the Oliver Wendell Holmes High School Band.  In the past, it has won numerous awards in marching and concert competitions.

Northside School of Innovation, Technology, and Entrepreneurship - N-SITE

On October 24, 2018, the official Business Careers High School Twitter page announced that in the fall of 2019, Business Careers High School will be discontinued, and in replacement, Northside School of Innovation, Technology, and Entrepreneurship will replace it.

N-SITE Curriculum
N-SITE has three main academies to choose upon the conclusion of Freshman year. The academies are Academy of Entrepreneurship, Academy of Computer Programming, and Academy of Cyber Security.

Academy of Entrepreneurship
In The Academy of Entrepreneurship, students are expected to take the classes Virtual Business and Social Media Marketing in their Sophomore Year, and an Entrepreneurship in their Junior Year.

Academy of Computer Programming
In The Academy of Computer Programming, students are expected to take Computer Programming 1 in their Sophomore year, and Computer Programming 2 in their Junior Year.

Academy of Cyber Security
In The Academy of Cyber Security, students are expected to take CISCO 1 in their Sophomore Year, and CISCO 2 in their Junior year.

Requirements
All students are required to take Principles of information Technology and Principles of Business, Marketing, and Finance their freshmen year. Additionally, all students are required to take the Virtual Enterprises Capstone Course their senior year.

Notable alumni
 Darold Williamson, Olympic Gold Medallist

References

External links
 Official Site of Northside Independent School District
 Official Site of Business Careers High School
 Official Site of Holmes High School
 Official Site of the National Academy Foundation
 Official Site of the UTSA Center for Professional Excellence (the home of Leadership Challenge)
 Official Site of the Texas Academic Decathlon
 Official Site of the Holmes Husky Band

Educational institutions established in 1991
High schools in San Antonio
Public high schools in Bexar County, Texas
Northside Independent School District high schools
Magnet schools in Texas
1991 establishments in Texas